Associação Atlética Rodoviária, commonly known as Rodoviária, were a Brazilian football team from Manaus, Amazonas state. They won the Campeonato Amazonense in 1973, and competed in the Série B in 1971.

History
Associação Atlética Rodoviária were founded on January 20, 1960, by employees of the Departamento de Rodagens of the city of Manaus (Manaus city Highway Department). They finished as the 1971 Campeonato Amazonense runners-up, after being defeated in the final by Fast Clube. Rodoviária competed in the Série B in 1971, when they were eliminated by Remo in the Second Stage of the competition. The club won the Campeonato Amazonense in 1973, after beating Rio Negro in the final. Rodoviária folded in 1976.

Stadium
Rodoviária played their home games at Estádio Parque Amazonense. The stadium had a maximum capacity of 10,000 people, and it was demolished in 1976.

Achievements

 Campeonato Amazonense:
 Winners (1): 1973

References

Defunct football clubs in Amazonas (Brazilian state)
Association football clubs established in 1960
Association football clubs disestablished in 1976
1960 establishments in Brazil
1976 disestablishments in Brazil